Oldhamstocks or Aldhamstocks ("old dwelling place") is a civil parish and small village in the east of East Lothian, Scotland, adjacent to the Scottish Borders and overlooking the North Sea . The church was consecrated by Bishop David de Bernham, 19 October 1242. Its chancel is a fine example of late Gothic — probably fifteenth-century work.

The summer Gala Day hosts activities such as sporting events. There is also judging of vegetables, plants and artwork.

Prior to 1891 the parish was also partly in Berwickshire and had a detached portion at Butterdean of 1417 acres.
The detached portion was transferred to Coldingham, Berwickshire, while the main part of the parish is now wholly within East Lothian.

In 1650 Oliver Cromwell spent a night in the village prior to defeating the Scots at the Battle of Dunbar.

Notable people
 John Broadwood (1732–1812), piano maker and founder of Broadwood and Sons, grew up in Oldhamstocks
 Robert Cranston (1890–1959), first-class cricketer
 John Currie, Moderator of the General Assembly of the Church of Scotland in 1709.
 James Hardy LL.D. (1815-1898), naturalist and antiquarian of Berwickshire and the Scottish Borders, born in Oldhamstocks
Bonaventure Hepburn OM (born James Hepburn; 14 July 1573, East Lothian – October 1620 or 1621, Venice, Italy) was a Scottish Roman Catholic linguist, lexicographer, philologist and biblical commentator.
 Alexander Somerville (15 March 1811 – 17 June 1885) was a British Radical journalist and soldier

References
Citations

Sources

See also
List of places in East Lothian
List of places in Scotland

External links

 Oldhamstocks information sheet produced by East Lothian Council
 Gazetteer entry
 Entry in the Ordnance Gazetteer of Scotland: A Survey of Scottish Topography, Statistical, Biographical and Historical

 
Villages in East Lothian